The rapes and murders of Jennifer Lee Ertman and Elizabeth Christine Peña, two teenage girls from Houston, Texas, aged 14 and 16, respectively, occurred on June 24, 1993. The murder of the two girls made headlines in Texas newspapers due to the nature of the crime and the new law resulting from the murder that allows families of the victims to view the execution of the murderers. The case was also notable in that the state of Texas rejected attempts by the International Court of Justice to halt several perpetrators' executions.

Peña and Ertman
Elizabeth Christine Peña (June 21, 1977 – June 24, 1993) and Jennifer Lee Ertman (August 15, 1978 – June 24, 1993) were close friends who both attended Waltrip High School.

Although the girls were just over one year in age difference, both sets of parents approved of their friendship, with Peña's father viewing Ertman—a modest girl who had only recently begun experimenting with makeup—as a "positive influence" on his daughter, later recollecting that, shortly after the two became friends at Waltrip High School, Peña "just straightened up her act" following a brief streak of teenage rebellion in his daughter before her 1992 enrollment at the school.

June 24, 1993
At 4:15 p.m. on June 24, 1993, Ertman's father, Randy, drove his only daughter to Peña's home. At approximately 8 p.m., Peña's mother, Melissa, drove the two girls to the home of their friend, Gina Escamilla, who lived in the Spring Hill Apartments and who was hosting a pool party for her school friends. As both girls exited the car, Peña assured her mother she and her friend would be home by their agreed 11:30 p.m. curfew.

When the pair realized they were going to be late returning home, they decided to leave the party to conform to the curfew both had promised their parents.

Ertman and Peña decided to take a 10-minute shortcut to Peña's residence in Oak Forest by following the railroad tracks and passing through T.C. Jester Park. This location was approximately one mile from Peña's home.

Gang initiation
The girls were walking along the White Oak Bayou when they encountered six "Black and White" gang members drinking beer shortly after holding the gang initiation ceremony of 17-year-old Raul Omar Villarreal.

Villarreal had not been a member of the Black and White gang or any gang but had engaged in this initiation ceremony whereby he had been forced to fight several gang members for five minutes successively before they judged whether to accept him. By approximately 10:30 p.m., Villarreal had successfully fought two gang members before being beaten midway through his fight with the third member. As he lay writhing and moaning on the ground after being temporarily knocked unconscious, the gang members conferred privately to discuss whether to accept Villarreal as a member.

Minutes later, the leader of the gang, Peter Cantu, approached Villarreal, exclaiming: "You're in! Dude, you're a badass! You're welcome to hang with us anytime!" Villarreal then sat alongside the other gang members, relaxing, talking, trading insults and compliments, and drinking beer. Shortly thereafter, he held a beer aloft, proclaiming things were to be great.

Abduction and assault
Within approximately 40 minutes of Villarreal accepting several bottles of beer from the other gang members and holding his first beer aloft, Ertman and Peña passed the gang. One member, José Medellín, attempted to grope and pinch one of Peña's breasts. Peña brushed aside Medellín's hand and continued walking. In response, Medellín stated: "No, baby! Where [are] you going?" He then clasped his arm around Peña's neck, threw her to the ground, and dragged her down a gravel decline in the direction of the other gang members as Peña screamed and pleaded for help. She was then forced to remove her underwear.

Ertman could've easily run to escape at this point but ran to help her friend. She was thrown to the ground by gang members Peter Cantu and Derrick Sean O'Brien.

Five of the gang members proceeded to rape both girls for more than an hour repeatedly. Both girls were sexually assaulted by all but one of the gang members, 14-year-old Venancio "Yuni" Medellín, on a minimum of four occasions. According to trial testimony, both Peña and Ertman repeatedly glanced in the direction of one another several times throughout their ordeal in likely gestures of concern and despair. Both repeatedly struggled against their abusers, with Peña on at least one occasion attempting to fight off her attackers by repeatedly kicking her legs, and Ertman biting her attackers. According to later testimony, on one occasion, Peña glanced in the direction of her younger friend as she was raped by Efrain Pérez and began weeping as she observed Ertman.

Murders
Realizing that the girls would be capable of identifying them, Cantu ordered the members to kill the girls. He told Venancio Medellín to stay behind because he was “too little to watch.” The other gang members forced the girls into a wooded area. Both girls were strangled to death. Following Cantu's initial instruction, Villarreal first shouted, "Get on your knees, bitch!" to Ertman. O'Brien (the only non-Hispanic, Black person in the gang) and Villarreal strangled Ertman with O'Brien's red nylon belt before breaking the belt. Both completed the act by strangling the girl with a shoelace in Peña's presence. 

As Ertman was murdered, Peña was forced to watch her friend's death as other gang members held a ligature around her neck. At first, Peña desperately attempted to appease her abusers as she wept, offering her phone number so they could "get together". She then attempted to flee. In response, Cantu tackled and repeatedly kicked the girl in her face and body, dislodging three teeth and fracturing several ribs.

Cantu, José Medellín, and Pérez then strangled Peña to death with shoelaces. The gang members stomped on both girls' throats to ensure their deaths.

Leaving the crime scene, Cantu handed Venancio Medellín a Goofy wristwatch taken from Ertman's body, saying, "Take this, I don't want it."

Cantu dropped off José Medellín, Pérez, and Villarreal at his residence, where he lived with his brother, Joe Cantu, and sister-in-law, Christina Cantu. Christina Cantu questioned why Villarreal was bleeding, and Pérez had a bloody shirt. This prompted Medellín to say the gang "had fun" and that details would appear on the news. He then elaborated that he had raped both girls.

Peter Cantu then returned and divided the valuables that had been stolen from the girls. José Medellín got a ring with an "E," so he could give it to his girlfriend, Esther. Medellín reported that he had killed a girl and noted that he would have found it easier with a gun. O'Brien was videotaped smiling at the scene of the crime. After the gang left, Christina Cantu convinced Joe Cantu to report the crime to the police.

Discovery
Four days after the murders, the girls' bodies were found in the park during hot weather conditions. Both bodies had significantly decomposed, and dental records were used for identification. The medical examiner corroborated that the cause of death was strangulation. All those believed responsible were ultimately arrested. Medellín gave both written and taped confessions.

Sentencing and incarceration

At sentencing, the offenders were remanded to the Texas Department of Criminal Justice (TDCJ) system. Peter Anthony Cantu, José Ernesto Medellín, Derrick Sean O'Brien, Efrain Pérez, and Raul Omar Villarreal received death sentences. Venancio Medellín, the brother of José Medellín, testified against 4 of the gang members. He received a 40-year prison sentence, the maximum for a juvenile, for the sexual assault of Jennifer Ertman. 
When the Supreme Court of the United States banned the executions of people who committed crimes while they were below 18 years of age, the sentences of Pérez and Villarreal were automatically commuted to life in prison. Pérez will become eligible for parole on October 10, 2029, while Villarreal will become eligible for parole on September 20, 2029.

Cantu, O'Brien, and José Medellín were later implicated in the January 4, 1993, murder of 27-year-old Patricia Lopez. Although none of them were charged (Cantu had already been sentenced to death by the time he was linked to Lopez's murder), Lopez's murder was mentioned in the sentencing phases of O'Brien and Medellín.

Executions
Derrick Sean O'Brien was the first to be executed, on July 11, 2006.

Before his execution, O'Brien expressed his regrets for his actions to the families of Peña and Ertman. He then apologized to his family before being executed by lethal injection. In response to accusations from anti-death penalty advocates that capital punishment is a cruel and unusual form of punishment, Peña's father later remarked O'Brien's death had occurred peacefully, "in twenty seconds", adding: "I wish to God that my daughter could have died that easily. Put a needle in her arm and just go to sleep. I wish to hell he could have died the way she died."

José Ernesto Medellín appealed his execution, saying that he had informed City of Houston and Harris County police officers that he was a Mexican citizen and that he had been unable to confer with Mexican consular officials. The prosecutors said that Medellín never told authorities he was a Mexican citizen. Medellín said in a sworn statement that he learned that the Mexican consulate could assist him in 1997. He petitioned the Texas Court of Criminal Appeals in 1998 regarding this issue; the appeal failed.

Medellín's impending execution became an international controversy since the state did not hold a hearing about whether the inability of Medellín to meet with Mexican consular officials harmed his defense. The right of a defendant to talk with his or her consulate is specified in the Vienna Convention on Consular Relations; the United States is a party to the convention, although the U.S. withdrew from compulsory jurisdiction in 1986 to accept the court's jurisdiction only on a case-by-case basis. In 2004, the International Court of Justice responded to a lawsuit filed by Mexico against the United States; the court ordered hearings to be held for inmates, including Medellín, who were denied consular rights.

In 2005, President George W. Bush ordered hearings to be held. The State of Texas, represented by Solicitor General Ted Cruz, challenged Bush's order, and the Supreme Court of the United States ruled that only the Congress of the United States has the right to order hearings to be held. In July, the World Court ordered a stay of Medellín's execution. Governor Rick Perry argued that Texas is not bound to World Court rulings. Death penalty opponents protested the impending execution. The families of both Ertman and Peña strongly favored the execution(s).

José Medellín was executed at 9:57 p.m. on August 5, 2008, after his last-minute appeals were rejected by the Supreme Court. Governor Perry rejected calls from Mexico and Washington, DC, to delay the execution, citing the torture, rape, and strangulation of two teenaged girls in Houston 15 years ago as just cause for the death penalty. During his lifetime, Randy Ertman advocated strongly against granting parole to Venancio Medellín.

Seventeen years after the crimes, Peter Anthony Cantu was executed on August 17, 2010. The lethal injection was performed at 6:09 p.m., and at 6:17 p.m., Cantu was officially pronounced dead.

Cantu, Medellín, and O'Brien are buried at Captain Joe Byrd Cemetery.

Aftermath
The parents of the murder victims successfully advocated for the State of Texas to allow victims' relatives to have permission to witness executions. Before the murders, Houston officials had stated that gangs were not a significant issue in the city. C.E. Anderson, a Houston Police Department officer who worked on the murder case, described the murder as "part of the impetus for the antigang programs in Houston." Jennifer Latson of the Houston Chronicle said that the deaths of the girls "shook" the Oak Forest neighborhood of Houston "to its foundation."

Randy Ertman, the father of Jennifer Ertman, died of lung cancer on August 18, 2014. Ertman had wanted to have Andy Kahan, the City of Houston's crime advocate, to witness the execution of Medellín. TDCJ refused to permit Kahan to witness the execution. Michelle Lyons, a TDCJ official, said that Tropical Storm Edouard would likely not be a factor preventing the execution of Medellín.

The Texas parole board denied parole on several occasions to Venancio Medellin, most recently in 2020. Medellin is scheduled to be released in 2034.

Waltrip High School has a memorial to the girls. Another memorial exists at T.C. Jester Park.

They are both buried at Woodlawn Garden of Memories Cemetery.

See also 

 Capital punishment in Texas
 List of people executed in Texas, 2000–2009
 List of people executed in Texas, 2010–2019
 List of people executed in the United States in 2006
 List of people executed in the United States in 2010
 List of solved missing person cases

Notes

References

Notes

Cited works and further reading

Further reading
 Mitchell, Corey. Pure Murder. Pinnacle Books, 2008. , 9780786018512. Available at Google Books.
 "Peter A. Cantu, Texas Executed August 17" (Chapter 35). In: Mangino, Matthew T. The Executioner's Toll, 2010: The Crimes, Arrests, Trials, Appeals, Last Meals, Final Words and Executions of 46 Persons in the United States. McFarland & Company, April 16, 2014. , 9780786479795. START: p. 158.

External links
 Contemporary news article pertaining to the murders of Jennifer Ertman and Elizabeth Peña
 Cantu v. State: Details of Cantu's 1997 appeal against his convictions
 Bush Administration vs. Texas on Death Row Case: a 2007 Chicago Tribune article focusing on the legal issues faced by the State of Texas prior to the execution of José Medellín
 2020 ABC 13 news article focusing on the most recent parole denial of Venancio Medellín 
 

1990s crimes in Texas
1990s missing person cases
1990s trials
1993 deaths
1993 in Texas
1993 murders in the United States
American torture victims
Capital murder cases
Crimes in Houston
Deaths by person in Texas
Deaths by strangulation in the United States
Female murder victims
Formerly missing people
Gang rape in the United States
History of women in Texas
Incidents of violence against girls
Incidents of violence against women
June 1993 crimes
June 1993 events in the United States
Kidnapping in the United States
Misogyny
Missing person cases in Texas
Murdered American children
Murder trials
People murdered in Texas
Rapes in the United States
Rape trials in the United States
Sexual assaults in the United States
Violence against women in the United States